LBS College  (Lal Bahadur Shastri Mahavidhyalaya) is a college in Dharmabad, Nanded district, Maharashtra, India. It grants bachelor's and master's degrees and has departments of zoology, biology, physics, chemistry and computer science, as well as departments of Marathi, English, and Hindi. The college was established in 1967.

References

External links

Universities and colleges in Maharashtra
Nanded district
Educational institutions established in 1967
1967 establishments in Maharashtra